Laxmi Nagar or Lakshmi Nagar (literally "City of Laxmi") may refer to:

 Laxmi Nagar (Delhi)
 Laxmi Nagar (Delhi Assembly constituency)
 Laxmi Nagar metro station
 Laxmi Nagar (Nepal)
 Laxminagar Colony, Mehdipatnam
 Lakshmi Nagar, Erode
 Laxmi Nagar, Great Nicobar